Gonçalo Miguel Azevedo Ribeiro (born 15 January 2006) is a Portuguese professional footballer who plays as a goalkeeper for the Liga Portugal 2 club Porto B.

Club career
Ribeiro is a youth product of FC Pedroso, Dragon Force FC, and Porto. He signed his first professional contract withh Porto on 8 April 2022 until 2026. He made his professional debut with Porto B in a 3–2 Liga Portugal 2 win over B-SAD on 14 August 2022, and 16 years 6 months and 31 days years old became the youngest ever goalkeeper in the division's history. He was named Porto's 2022 Young Athlete of the Year in December 2022.

International career
Ribeiro is a youth international for Portugal, having played up to the Portugal U19s.

References

External links
 
 FPF Profile

2006 births
Living people
Sportspeople from Vila Nova de Gaia
Portuguese footballers
Portugal youth international footballers
Association football goalkeepers
FC Porto B players
Liga Portugal 2 players